The Battle of Kashgar was a military confrontation that took place in 1934 during the Xinjiang Wars. Turkic Muslim Uyghur and Kirghiz fighters under Emir Abdullah Bughra and other Turkic separatists began four separate attacks over a six-day period on Hui and Han Chinese soldiers led by Gen. Ma Zhancang, trapping them inside Kashgar. Khoja Niyas Hajji joined the attack with his own Kumul Uyghur fighters after a 300-mile trek from Aksu - from which he was driven out by a force of Chinese Muslims — appearing at the walls of Kashgar on 13 January. The Chinese Muslim and Chinese forces repulsed the Turkic fighters, inflicting severe casualties upon them.

Gen. Ma Fuyuan of the New 36th Division then stormed Kashgar and attacked the Uyghur and Kirghiz rebels of the First East Turkestan Republic. He freed Ma Zhancang and the trapped Chinese troops. Ma Zhancang and Ma Fuyuan then defeated and drove out the remaining Turkic fighters. Estimates are that 2,000 to 8,000 Uighur civilians were killed in revenge for the Kizil massacre. In April 1934, Gen. Ma Zhongying personally gave a speech at Idgah mosque, telling the Uighurs to be loyal to the Republic of China government at Nanjing. Several British citizens at the British consulate were murdered by troops of the New 36th Division in two separate incidents in March 1934. The Chinese Muslims were referred to as "Tungan tribesmen"; initial reports were that 2,000 Uighurs and several members of the British consulate were killed. The Uighurs were reinforced by troops from Yark and Hotan and Kirghiz tribesmen.

References

Kashgar 1934
1934 in China
Kashgar
January 1934 events
February 1934 events
Xinjiang Wars
Mass murder in 1934
Persecution of Uyghurs
Massacres committed by China